The WGBH Educational Foundation (also known as GBH since August 2020) is an American public broadcasting group based in Boston, Massachusetts. Established in 1951, it holds the licenses to all of the PBS member stations in Massachusetts, and operates its flagship station WGBH-TV, sister station WGBX-TV, and a group of NPR member stations in the state. It also owns WGBY-TV in Springfield, which is operated by New England Public Media under a program service agreement.

Nationally, WGBH is known as the distributor of a number of major PBS programs, including American Experience, Arthur, Frontline, Masterpiece, and Nova, among others; as the owner of Public Radio International until 2018, a syndicate of public radio programming; and for its role in the development of closed captioning and audio description technologies for broadcast television.

History

In 2003, WGBH and the City of Boston formed a joint venture for Boston Kids & Family TV channel that replaces one of the city's cable access channels. Boston Kids was launched on October 31, 2003.

By December 2005, Boston’s WGBH and New York City's WNET were already broadcasting a local version of World on a subchannel. and added by April 2006, Washington’s WETA. Then, WGBH and WNET teamed up with PBS, APT and NETA to roll out a national version of the local channels as PBS World. The network was launched nationally on August 15, 2007.

In July 2012, WGBH acquired Public Radio International (PRI). PRI would continue with its own board while WGBH would be able to distribute more of its programs through PRI.

In November 2015, WGBH purchased GlobalPost, with editorial operation and reporting resources being merged with PRI's The World news staff.

On August 27, 2020, it was announced that WGBH would shorten its name to "GBH" as part of a larger corporate reimaging (which saw the adoption of purple as a new corporate color, and a font originally commissioned for Red Hat as its new corporate typeface) The foundation stated that due to its present-day multi-platform operations, the full WGBH call sign was too synonymous with broadcast media; "WGBH" will still be used as part of the organization's formal name. All other WGBH-owned and operated stations similarly dropped the W from their respective brandings, such as WCRB rebranding as "CRB Classical 99.5".

Board of Trustees
Richard M. Burnes Jr. of Charles River Ventures is the chair of the board as of 2014, replacing Amos Hostetter Jr., who left the board.  Henry P. Becton Jr., former WGBH President, and Maureen L. Ruettgers, the wife of former EMC Corporation CEO Michael Ruettgers, are vice chairs. Jonathan C. Abbott, as WGBH president, is also on the board. William N. Thorndike Jr., managing partner of the Housatonic Partners private equity firm, is on the board of trustees as the chair of the WGBH board of overseers.

The presidents of four regional universities are institutional trustees:  Joseph E. Aoun of Northeastern University, Jackie Jenkins-Scott of Wheelock College, Frederick M. Lawrence of Brandeis University, and L. Rafael Reif of MIT.

The remaining board members are:
 Amy Abrams, wife of Abrams Capital founder David C. Abrams
 Terrie F. Bloom, wife of Berkshire Partners managing director Bradley Bloom
 Laura A. DeBonis, former Google Books manager and wife of hedge fund executive and State Department official Scott Nathan
 Juan Enriquez, managing director of Excel Venture Management and husband of Cabot family heir Marjorie Cabot Lewis
 Ann L. Gund, wife of architect Graham Gund
 Susan B. Kaplan, daughter of Stanley H Kaplan and president of the Kaplin Family Foundation
 Marjie B. Kargman, wife of Commonwealth Capital Ventures founder Robert Kargman
 Sara Lawrence-Lightfoot, sociologist
 William A. Lowell, partner of the Choate, Hall & Stewart law firm
 Richard K. Lubin, managing director of Berkshire Partners
 Oscar F. Malcolm, president of Darien Capital Management
 Christopher J. McKown, husband of Fidelity Investments executive Abigail Johnson
 Cathy E. Minehan, former president of the Federal Reserve Bank of Boston 
 Paul R. Murphy, former partner at the Foley Hoag law firm and former counsel for Amherst College
 Melinda Alliker Rabb, Brown University professor and wife of Stop & Shop heir James Rabb
 Henri A. Termeer, retired chairman, president, and CEO of Genzyme Corporation
 David T. Ting, president of Mugar Enterprises, the investment firm of Star Market heir David Mugar
 Hans Ziegler, retired senior managing director of Bernstein Global Wealth Management

Units
 First 8 Studios, learning mobile app design group for kids ages 8 and younger
 Forum Network, a Lowell Institute funded online lecture
 GlobalPost
 PBS Distribution, a joint venture with PBS to distribute PBS and WGBH programs to various markets, home video, foreign, and commercial
 PBS LearningMedia, a joint venture with PBS to distribute teacher material related to PBS programs
 WGBH Education

Radio
 WCAI
 WCRB
 WGBH
 WNAN
 WZAI
WCAI, WNAN, and WZAI are the Cape, Coast, and Islands (CCI) NPR stations, serving part of southeastern Massachusetts.

Former Radio Properties
 Public Radio International (merged with Public Radio Exchange in 2018)

Television
 WGBH-TV: the foundation's flagship station
 WGBX-TV: its secondary Boston station
 WGBY-TV: Springfield, Massachusetts station; Operated by New England Public Media under a program service operating agreement. 
 Create (TV network), a joint venture network with American Public Television (APT), WGBH, WNET, and National Educational Telecommunications Association (NETA).
 World Channel, a joint venture network with WNET, NETA, and APT.

Public Media Management

Public Media Management is a joint venture of WGBH and Sony Electronics for remote TV master control services over the internet.

Public Media Management was tested for a year. The services were available starting April 1, 2015, just before the two Las Vegas shows, PBS's April 8–10 TechCon and NAB Show April 11–16, to be able to showcase the service during the shows. WGBH's two Boston stations went live with PMM first followed by its Springfield, Massachusetts station WGBY in early May 2015. New Hampshire Public Television launched the system next. In August 2015, Maryland Public Television switched to using their system.

See also
 Ralph Lowell, president of the foundation, 1951–1970s

References

External links

WGBH alumni website
forum-network.org
first8studios.org

 
1951 establishments in Massachusetts
Culture of Boston
Educational organizations based in the United States
Mass media in Boston
Non-profit organizations based in Boston
Organizations established in 1951
Peabody Award winners
Public Radio International
Radio organizations in the United States
Television organizations in the United States